Samuel Nascimento (born October 19, 1990) is an actor, singer and Brazilian dancer. He is known for playing in the series Violetta on Disney Channel.

Life and career 

He first began singing in his teens with his friends at the church which he attended with his family. He participated in several bands, in which he sang, danced, and played. He participated in the High School Musical: The Selection, and was among the 12 finalists to be part of the local version of High School Musical: The Challenge. He also played the role of DJ in the Brazilian series Quando Toca o Sino, which was inspired by the US version As the Bell Rings. From 2012 to 2015 he played the role of Broduey in the series of Disney Channel, Violetta.

Filmography

Awards and nominations

References 

Brazilian male film actors
Brazilian male dancers
1990 births
Living people
People from Guarulhos
21st-century Brazilian dancers
21st-century Brazilian male actors